Howard station may refer to:

Howard station (Capital MetroRail), a commuter rail station in Austin, Texas, United States
Howard station (CTA), a Chicago Transit Authority station in Chicago, Illinois, United States
Howard station (LIRR), a former Long Island Railroad station in Queens, New York, United States
Howard railway station, in Queensland, Australia